is a passenger railway station in the town of Sakae, Chiba Prefecture, Japan, operated by East Japan Railway Company (JR East).

Lines
Ajiki Station is served by the Abiko Branch Line of the Narita Line, and lies 23.2 kilometers from the terminus of the line at Abiko Station.

Station layout
The station consists of dual opposed side platforms connected by a footbridge. The station has a Midori no Madoguchi staffed ticket office.

Platforms

History
Ajiki Station was opened on February 2, 1901, as a station on the Narita Railway Company for both freight and passenger operations. On September 1, 1920, the Narita Railway was nationalised, becoming part of the Japanese Government Railway (JGR).  After World War II, the JGR became the Japan National Railways (JNR). Scheduled freight operations were suspended from June 10, 1970. The station was absorbed into the JR East network upon the privatization of the Japan National Railways (JNR) on April 1, 1987.

Passenger statistics
In fiscal 2019, the station was used by an average of 2427 passengers daily.

Surrounding area
 
 Sakae Town Hall

See also
 List of railway stations in Japan

References

External links

 JR East station information 

Railway stations in Japan opened in 1901
Railway stations in Chiba Prefecture
Narita Line
Sakae, Chiba